In personality typology, the Myers–Briggs Type Indicator (MBTI) is an introspective self-report questionnaire indicating differing psychological preferences in how people perceive the world and make decisions. Despite its popularity, it has been widely regarded as pseudoscience by the scientific community. The test attempts to assign a value to each of four categories: introversion or extraversion, sensing or intuition, thinking or feeling, and judging or perceiving. One letter from each category is taken to produce a four-letter test result, such as "INTJ" or "ESFP".

The MBTI was constructed by two Americans: Katharine Cook Briggs and her daughter Isabel Briggs Myers, who were inspired by the book Psychological Types by Swiss psychiatrist Carl Jung. Isabel Myers was particularly fascinated by the concept of introversion and she typed herself as an INFP. However, she felt the book was too complex for the general public, and therefore she tried to organize the Jungian cognitive functions to make it more accessible.

Most of the research supporting the MBTI's validity has been produced by the Center for Applications of Psychological Type, an organization run by the Myers-Briggs Foundation, and published in the center's own journal, the Journal of Psychological Type (JPT), raising questions of independence, bias, and conflict of interest. Though the MBTI resembles some psychological theories, it has been criticized as pseudoscience and is not widely endorsed by academic researchers in the psychology field. The indicator exhibits significant scientific (psychometric) deficiencies, including poor validity, poor reliability, measuring categories that are not independent, and not being comprehensive.

History

Briggs began her research into personality in 1917. Upon meeting her future son-in-law, she observed marked differences between his personality and that of other family members. Briggs embarked on a project of reading biographies, and subsequently developed a typology wherein she proposed four temperaments: meditative (or thoughtful), spontaneous, executive, and social.

After the English translation of Carl Jung's book Psychological Types was published in 1923 (first published in German in 1921), Briggs recognized that Jung's theory was similar to, but went far beyond, her own. Briggs's four types were later identified as corresponding to the IXXXs (Introverts: "meditative"), EXXPs (Extraverts & Prospectors: "spontaneous"), EXTJs (Extraverts, Thinkers & Judgers: "executive") and EXFJs (Extraverts, Feelers & Judgers: "social"). Her first publications were two articles describing Jung's theory, in the journal New Republic in 1926 ("Meet Yourself Using the Personality Paint Box") and 1928 ("Up From Barbarism"). After extensively studying the work of Jung, Briggs and her daughter extended their interest in human behavior into efforts to turn the theory of psychological types to practical use.

Although Myers graduated from Swarthmore College in 1919, neither Myers nor Briggs was formally educated in the discipline of psychology, and both were self-taught in the field of psychometric testing. Myers therefore apprenticed herself to Edward N. Hay, who was personnel manager for a large Philadelphia bank. From Hay, Myers learned rudimentary test construction, scoring, validation, and statistical methods.

Briggs and Myers began creating their indicator during World War II in the belief that a knowledge of personality preferences would help women entering the industrial workforce for the first time to identify the sorts of war-time jobs that would be the "most comfortable and effective" for them. The Briggs Myers Type Indicator Handbook was published in 1944, and changed its name to "Myers–Briggs Type Indicator" in 1956.

Myers' work attracted the attention of Henry Chauncey, head of the Educational Testing Service. Under these auspices, the first MBTI "manual" was published, in 1962. The MBTI received further support from Donald W. MacKinnon, head of the Institute of Personality and Social Research at the University of California, Berkeley; W. Harold Grant, a professor at Michigan State University and Auburn University; and Mary H. McCaulley of the University of Florida. The publication of the MBTI was transferred to Consulting Psychologists Press in 1975, and the Center for Applications of Psychological Type was founded as a research laboratory.

After Myers' death in May 1980, Mary McCaulley updated the MBTI manual, and the second edition was published in 1985. The third edition appeared in 1998.

Format and administration

In 1987, an advanced scoring system was developed for the MBTI. From this was developed the Type Differentiation Indicator (TDI), which is a scoring system for the longer MBTI, Form J, which includes the 290 items written by Myers that had survived her previous item analyses. It yields 20 subscales (five under each of the four dichotomous preference scales), plus seven additional subscales for a new "comfort-discomfort" factor (which parallels, though not perfectly measuring, the missing factor of neuroticism). This factor's scales indicate a sense of overall comfort and confidence versus discomfort and anxiety. They also load onto one of the four type dimensions:

 guarded-optimistic (T/F),
 defiant-compliant (T/F),
 carefree-worried (T/F),
 decisive-ambivalent (J/P),
 intrepid-inhibited (E/I),
 leader-follower (E/I), and
 proactive-distractible (J/P).

Also included is a composite of these called "strain". There are also scales for type-scale consistency and comfort-scale consistency. Reliability of 23 of the 27 TDI subscales is greater than 0.50, "an acceptable result given the brevity of the subscales."

In 1989, a scoring system was developed for only the 20 subscales for the original four dichotomies. This was initially known as Form K or the Expanded Analysis Report. This tool is now called the MBTI Step II.

Form J or the TDI included the items (derived from Myers' and McCaulley's earlier work) necessary to score what became known as Step III. (The 1998 MBTI Manual reported that the two instruments were one and the same) It was developed in a joint project involving the following organizations: the Myers-Briggs Company, the publisher of all the MBTI works; the Center for Applications of Psychological Type (CAPT), which holds all of Myers' and McCaulley's original work; and the MBTI Trust headed by Katharine and Peter Myers. Step III was advertised as addressing type development and the use of perception and judgment by respondents.

Concepts 
The MBTI is based on the influential theory of psychological types proposed by Swiss psychiatrist Carl Jung in 1921, who had speculated that people experience the world using four principal psychological functions—sensation, intuition, feeling, and thinking—and that one of these four functions is dominant for a person most of the time. The four categories are introversion/extraversion, sensing/intuition, thinking/feeling, judging/perceiving. According to the MBTI, each person is said to have one preferred quality from each category, producing 16 unique types.

The MBTI emphasizes the value of naturally occurring differences. "The underlying assumption of the MBTI is that we all have specific preferences in the way we construe our experiences, and these preferences underpin our interests, needs, values, and motivation."

The MBTI Manual states that the indicator "is designed to implement a theory; therefore, the theory must be understood to understand the MBTI". Fundamental to the MBTI is the hypothesis of psychological types as originally developed by Carl Jung. Jung proposed the existence of two dichotomous pairs of cognitive functions:
 The "rational" (judging) functions: thinking and feeling.
 The "irrational" (perceiving) functions: sensation and intuition.

Jung believed that for every person, each of the functions is expressed primarily in either an introverted or extraverted form. Based on Jung's original concepts, Briggs and Myers developed their own theory of psychological type, described below, on which the MBTI is based. However, although psychologist Hans Eysenck called the MBTI a moderately successful quantification of Jung's original principles as outlined in Psychological Types, he also said, "[The MBTI] creates 16 personality types which are said to be similar to Jung's theoretical concepts. I have always found difficulties with this identification, which omits one half of Jung's theory (he had 32 types, by asserting that for every conscious combination of traits there was an opposite unconscious one). Obviously, the latter half of his theory does not admit of questionnaire measurement, but to leave it out and pretend that the scales measure Jungian concepts is hardly fair to Jung." In any event, both models remain hypothetical, with no controlled scientific studies supporting either Jung's original concept of type or the Myers–Briggs variation.

Differences from Jung

Jung did not see the types (such as intra- and extraversion) as dualistic, but rather as tendencies: both are innate and have the potential to balance.

Jung's typology theories postulated a sequence of four cognitive functions (thinking, feeling, sensation, and intuition), each having one of two polar tendencies (extraversion or introversion), giving a total of eight dominant functions. The MBTI is based on these eight hypothetical functions, although with some differences in expression from Jung's model. While the Jungian model offers empirical evidence for the first three dichotomies, the Briggs added the judgment-perception  preference. 

The most notable addition of Myers' and Briggs' ideas to Jung's original thought is their concept that a given type's fourth letter (J or P) indicates a person's most preferred extraverted function, which is the dominant function for extraverted types and the auxiliary function for introverted types.

Jung hypothesised that the dominant function acts alone in its preferred world: exterior for extraverts and interior for introverts. The remaining three functions, he suggested, operate in the opposite orientation. Some MBTI practitioners, however, place doubt on this concept as being a category error with next to no empirical evidence backing it relative to other findings with correlation evidence, yet as a theory it still remains part of Myers' and Briggs' extrapolation of their original theory despite being discounted.

Jung's hypothesis can be summarised as: if the dominant cognitive function is introverted, then the other functions are extraverted and vice versa. The MBTI Manual summarizes Jung's work of balance in psychological type as follows: "There are several references in Jung's writing to the three remaining functions having an opposite attitudinal character. For example, in writing about introverts with thinking dominant ... Jung commented that the counterbalancing functions have an extraverted character." Using the INTP type as an example, the orientation according to Jung would be as follows:
 Dominant introverted thinking
 Auxiliary extraverted intuition
 Tertiary introverted sensing
 Inferior extraverted feeling

Type dynamics and development

Jung's typological model regards psychological type as similar to left or right handedness: people are either born with, or develop, certain preferred ways of perceiving and deciding. The MBTI sorts some of these psychological differences into four opposite pairs, or "dichotomies", with a resulting 16 possible psychological types. None of these are considered to be "better" or "worse"; however, Briggs and Myers theorized that people innately "prefer" one overall combination of type differences. In the same way that writing with the left hand is difficult for a right-hander, so people tend to find using their opposite psychological preferences more difficult, though they can become more proficient (and therefore behaviorally flexible) with practice and development.

The 16 types are typically referred to by an abbreviation of four letters—the initial letters of each of their four type preferences (except in the case of intuition, which uses the abbreviation "N" to distinguish it from introversion). For instance:
 ESTJ: extraversion (E), sensing (S), thinking (T), judgment (J)
 INFP: introversion (I), intuition (N), feeling (F), perception (P)
These abbreviations are applied to all 16 types.

The interaction of two, three, or four preferences is known as "type dynamics". Although type dynamics has received little or no empirical support to substantiate its viability as a scientific theory, Myers and Briggs asserted that for each of the 16 four-preference types, one function is the most dominant and is likely to be evident earliest in life. A secondary or auxiliary function typically becomes more evident (differentiated) during teenaged years and provides balance to the dominant. In normal development, individuals tend to become more fluent with a third, tertiary function during mid-life, while the fourth, inferior function remains least consciously developed. The inferior function is often considered to be more associated with the unconscious, being most evident in situations such as high stress (sometimes referred to as being "in the grip" of the inferior function).

However, the use of type dynamics is disputed: in the conclusion of various studies on the subject of type dynamics, James H. Reynierse writes, "Type dynamics has persistent logical problems and is fundamentally based on a series of category mistakes; it provides, at best, a limited and incomplete account of type related phenomena"; and "type dynamics relies on anecdotal evidence, fails most efficacy tests, and does not fit the empirical facts". His studies gave the clear result that the descriptions and workings of type dynamics do not fit the real behavior of people. He suggests getting completely rid of type dynamics, because it does not help, but hinders understanding of personality. The presumed order of functions 1 to 4 did only occur in one out of 540 test results.

Four dichotomies 

The four pairs of preferences or "dichotomies" are shown in the adjacent table.

The terms used for each dichotomy have specific technical meanings relating to the MBTI, which differ from their everyday usage. For example, people who prefer judgment over perception are not necessarily more "judgmental" or less "perceptive", nor does the MBTI instrument measure aptitude; it simply indicates for one preference over another. Someone reporting a high score for extraversion over introversion cannot be correctly described as more extraverted: they simply have a clear preference.

Point scores on each of the dichotomies can vary considerably from person to person, even among those with the same type. However, Isabel Myers considered the direction of the preference (for example, E vs. I) to be more important than the degree of the preference (for example, very clear vs. slight).  The expression of a person's psychological type is more than the sum of the four individual preferences. The preferences interact through type dynamics and type development.

Attitudes: extraversion/introversion 
Myers–Briggs literature uses the terms extraversion and introversion as Jung first used them. Extraversion means literally outward-turning and introversion, inward-turning. These specific definitions differ somewhat from the popular usage of the words. Extraversion is the spelling used in MBTI publications.

The preferences for extraversion and introversion are often called "attitudes". Briggs and Myers recognized that each of the cognitive functions can operate in the external world of behavior, action, people, and things ("extraverted attitude") or the internal world of ideas and reflection ("introverted attitude"). The MBTI assessment sorts for an overall preference for one or the other.

People who prefer extraversion draw energy from action: they tend to act, then reflect, then act further. If they are inactive, their motivation tends to decline. To rebuild their energy, extraverts need breaks from time spent in reflection. Conversely, those who prefer introversion "expend" energy through action: they prefer to reflect, then act, then reflect again. To rebuild their energy, introverts need quiet time alone, away from activity.

An extravert's flow is directed outward toward people and objects, whereas the introvert's is directed inward toward concepts and ideas. Contrasting characteristics between extraverted and introverted people include:
 Extraverted are action-oriented, while introverted are thought-oriented.
 Extraverted seek breadth of knowledge and influence, while introverted seek depth of knowledge and influence.
 Extraverted often prefer more frequent interaction, while introverted prefer more substantial interaction.
 Extraverted recharge and get their energy from spending time with people, while introverted recharge and get their energy from spending time alone; they consume their energy through the opposite process.

Functions: sensing/intuition and thinking/feeling 

Jung identified two pairs of psychological functions:
 Two perceiving functions: sensation (usually called sensing in MBTI writings) and intuition
 Two judging functions: thinking and feeling

According to Jung's typology model, each person uses one of these four functions more dominantly and proficiently than the other three; however, all four functions are used at different times depending on the circumstances. Because each function can manifest in either an extraverted or an introverted attitude, Jung's model includes eight combinations of functions and attitudes, four of which are largely conscious and four unconscious. John Beebe created a model that combines ideas of archetypes and the dialogical self with functions, each function viewed as performing the role of an archetype within an internal dialog.

Sensing and intuition are the information-gathering (perceiving) functions. They describe how new information is understood and interpreted. People who prefer sensing are more likely to trust information that is in the present, tangible, and concrete: that is, information that can be understood by the five senses. They tend to distrust hunches, which seem to come "out of nowhere". They prefer to look for details and facts. For them, the meaning is in the data. On the other hand, those who prefer intuition tend to trust information that is less dependent upon the senses, that can be associated with other information (either remembered or discovered by seeking a wider context or pattern). They may be more interested in future possibilities. For them, the meaning is in the underlying theory and principles which are manifested in the data.

Thinking and feeling are the decision-making (judging) functions. The thinking and feeling functions are both used to make rational decisions, based on the data received from their information-gathering functions (sensing or intuition). Those who prefer thinking tend to decide things from a more detached standpoint, measuring the decision by what seems reasonable, logical, causal, consistent, and matching a given set of rules. Those who prefer feeling tend to come to decisions by associating or empathizing with the situation, looking at it 'from the inside' and weighing the situation to achieve, on balance, the greatest harmony, consensus and fit, considering the needs of the people involved. Thinkers usually have trouble interacting with people who are inconsistent or illogical, and tend to give very direct feedback to others. They are concerned with the truth and view it as more important.

As noted already, people who prefer thinking do not necessarily, in the everyday sense, "think better" than their feeling counterparts, in the common sense; the opposite preference is considered an equally rational way of coming to decisions (and, in any case, the MBTI assessment is a measure of preference, not ability). Similarly, those who prefer feeling do not necessarily have "better" emotional reactions than their thinking counterparts.

Dominant function 
According to Jung, people use all four cognitive functions. However, one function is generally used in a more conscious and confident way. This dominant function is supported by the secondary (auxiliary) function, and to a lesser degree the tertiary function. The fourth and least conscious function is always the opposite of the dominant function. Myers called this inferior function the "shadow."

The four functions operate in conjunction with the attitudes (extraversion and introversion). Each function is used in either an extraverted or introverted way. A person whose dominant function is extraverted intuition, for example, uses intuition very differently from someone whose dominant function is introverted intuition.

Lifestyle preferences: judging/perception 
Myers and Briggs added another dimension to Jung's typological model by identifying that people also have a preference for using either the judging function (thinking or feeling) or their perceiving function (sensing or intuition) when relating to the outside world (extraversion).

Myers and Briggs held that types with a preference for judging show the world their preferred judging function (thinking or feeling). So, TJ types tend to appear to the world as logical and FJ types as empathetic. According to Myers, judging types like to "have matters settled". Those types who prefer perception show the world their preferred perceiving function (sensing or intuition). So, SP types tend to appear to the world as concrete and NP types as abstract. According to Myers, perceptive types prefer to "keep decisions open". For extraverts, the J or P indicates their dominant function; for introverts, the J or P indicates their auxiliary function. Introverts tend to show their dominant function outwardly only in matters "important to their inner worlds". For example, because the ENTJ type is extraverted, the J indicates that the dominant function is the preferred judging function (extraverted thinking). The ENTJ type introverts the auxiliary perceiving function (introverted intuition). The tertiary function is sensing and the inferior function is introverted feeling. Because the INTJ type is introverted, however, the J instead indicates that the auxiliary function is the preferred judging function (extraverted thinking). The INTJ type introverts the dominant perceiving function (introverted intuition). The tertiary function is feeling and the inferior function is extraverted sensing.

Criticism
Despite its popularity, it has been widely regarded as pseudoscience by the scientific community. The validity (statistical validity and test validity) of the MBTI as a psychometric instrument has been the subject of much criticism. Media reports have called the test "pretty much meaningless", and "one of the worst personality tests in existence",. The psychologist Adam Grant is especially vocal against MBTI. He called it "the fad that won't die" in the Psychology Today article. Psychometric specialist Robert Hogan wrote: "Most personality psychologists regard the MBTI as little more than an elaborate Chinese fortune cookie..."

It has been estimated that between a third and a half of the published material on the MBTI has been produced for the special conferences of the Center for the Application of Psychological Type (which provide the training in the MBTI, and are funded by sales of the MBTI) or as papers in the Journal of Psychological Type (which is edited and supported by Myers–Briggs advocates and by sales of the indicator). It has been argued that this reflects a lack of critical scrutiny. Many of the studies that endorse MBTI are methodologically weak or unscientific. A 1996 review by Gardner and Martinko concluded: "It is clear that efforts to detect simplistic linkages between type preferences and managerial effectiveness have been disappointing. Indeed, given the mixed quality of research and the inconsistent findings, no definitive conclusion regarding these relationships can be drawn."

The test has been described as one of many self-discovery "fads" and has been likened to horoscopes, as both rely on the Barnum effect, flattery, and confirmation bias, leading participants to personally identify with descriptions that are somewhat desirable, vague, and widely applicable.

Currently, MBTI is not ready to be adopted in counseling.

Little evidence for dichotomies 
As previously stated in the  section, Isabel Myers considered the direction of the preference (for example, E vs. I) to be more important than the degree of the preference. Statistically, this would mean that scores on each MBTI scale would show a bimodal distribution with most people scoring near the ends of the scales, thus dividing people into either, e.g., an extraverted or an introverted psychological type. However, most studies have found that scores on the individual scales were actually distributed in a centrally peaked manner, similar to a normal distribution, indicating that the majority of people were actually in the middle of the scale and were thus neither clearly introverted nor extraverted. Most personality traits do show a normal distribution of scores from low to high, with about 15% of people at the low end, about 15% at the high end and the majority of people in the middle ranges. But in order for the MBTI to be scored, a cut-off line is used at the middle of each scale and all those scoring below the line are classified as a low type and those scoring above the line are given the opposite type. Thus, psychometric assessment research fails to support the concept of type, but rather shows that most people lie near the middle of a continuous curve.

Little evidence for "dynamic" type stack
Some MBTI supporters argue that the application of type dynamics to MBTI (e.g. where inferred "dominant" or "auxiliary" functions like Se / "Extraverted Sensing" or Ni / "Introverted Intuition" are presumed to exist) is a logical category error that has little empirical evidence backing it.  Instead, they argue that Myers–Briggs validity as a psychometric tool is highest when each type of category is viewed independently as a dichotomy.

Validity and utility 
The content of the MBTI scales is problematic. In 1991, a National Academy of Sciences committee reviewed data from MBTI research studies and concluded that only the I-E scale has high correlations with comparable scales of other instruments and low correlations with instruments designed to assess different concepts, showing strong validity. In contrast, the S-N and T-F scales show relatively weak validity. The 1991 review committee concluded at the time there was "not sufficient, well-designed research to justify the use of the MBTI in career counseling programs". This study based its measurement of validity on "criterion-related validity (i.e. does the MBTI predict specific outcomes related to interpersonal relations or career success/job performance?)." The committee stressed the discrepancy between popularity of the MBTI and research results stating, "the popularity of this instrument in the absence of proven scientific worth is troublesome." There is insufficient evidence to make claims about utility, particularly of the four letter type derived from a person's responses to the MBTI items.

Lack of objectivity 
The accuracy of the MBTI depends on honest self-reporting. Unlike some personality questionnaires, such as the 16PF Questionnaire, the Minnesota Multiphasic Personality Inventory, or the Personality Assessment Inventory, the MBTI does not use validity scales to assess exaggerated or socially desirable responses. As a result, individuals motivated to do so can fake their responses, and one study found that the MBTI judgment/perception dimension correlates weakly with the Eysenck Personality Questionnaire lie scale. If respondents "fear they have something to lose, they may answer as they assume they should." However, the MBTI ethical guidelines state, "It is unethical and in many cases illegal to require job applicants to take the Indicator if the results will be used to screen out applicants." The intent of the MBTI is to provide "a framework for understanding individual differences, and... a dynamic model of individual development".

Terminology
The terminology of the MBTI has been criticized as being very "vague and general", so as to allow any kind of behavior to fit any personality type, which may result in the Barnum effect, where people give a high rating to a positive description that supposedly applies specifically to them. Others argue that while the MBTI type descriptions are brief, they are also distinctive and precise. Some theorists, such as David Keirsey, have expanded on the MBTI descriptions, providing even greater detail. For instance, Keirsey's descriptions of his four temperaments, which he correlated with the sixteen MBTI personality types, show how the temperaments differ in terms of language use, intellectual orientation, educational and vocational interests, social orientation, self-image, personal values, social roles, and characteristic hand gestures.

Factor analysis
Researchers have reported that the JP and the SN scales correlate with one another. One factor-analytic study based on (N=1291) college-aged students found six different factors instead of the four purported dimensions, thereby raising doubts as to the construct validity of the MBTI.

Correlates
According to Hans Eysenck:

The main dimension in the MBTI is called E-I, or extraversion-introversion; this is mostly a sociability scale, correlating quite well with the MMPI social introversion scale (negatively) and the Eysenck Extraversion scale (positively). Unfortunately, the scale also has a loading on neuroticism, which correlates with the introverted end. Thus introversion correlates roughly (i.e. averaging values for males and females) -.44 with dominance, +.37 with abasement, +.46 with counselling readiness, -.52 with self-confidence, -.36 with personal adjustment, and -.45 with empathy. The failure of the scale to disentangle Introversion and Neuroticism (there is no scale for neurotic and other psychopathological attributes in the MBTI) is its worst feature, only equalled by the failure to use factor analysis in order to test the arrangement of items in the scale.

Reliability
The test-retest reliability of the MBTI tends to be low. Large numbers of people (between 39% and 76% of respondents) obtain different type classifications when retaking the indicator after only five weeks. A 2013 Fortune Magazine article titled "Have we all been duped by the Myers-Briggs Test" wrote:

Within each dichotomy scale, as measured on Form G, about 83% of categorizations remain the same when people are retested within nine months and around 75% when retested after nine months. About 50% of people re-administered the MBTI within nine months remain the same overall type and 36% the same type after more than nine months. For Form M (the most current form of the MBTI instrument), the MBTI Manual reports that these scores are higher.

In one study, when people were asked to compare their preferred type to that assigned by the MBTI assessment, only half of people chose the same profile.

It has been argued that criticisms regarding the MBTI mostly come down to questions regarding the validity of its origins, not questions regarding the validity of the MBTI's usefulness.  Others argue that the MBTI can be a reliable measurement of personality, and "like all measures, the MBTI yields scores that are dependent on sample characteristics and testing conditions".

Statistics
A 1973 study of university students in the United States found the INFP type was the most common type among students studying the fine arts and art education subjects, with 36% of fine arts students and 26% of art education students being INFPs. A 1973 study of the personality types of teachers in the United States found Intuitive-Perceptive types (ENFP, INFP, ENTP, INTP) were over-represented in teachers of subjects such as English, social studies and art, as opposed to science and mathematics, which featured more sensing (S) and judging (J) types. A questionnaire of 27,787 high school students suggested INFP students among them showed a significant preference for art, English, and music subjects.

Utility
Isabel Myers claimed that the proportion of different personality types varied by choice of career or course of study. However, researchers examining the proportions of each type within varying professions report that the proportion of MBTI types within each occupation is close to that within a random sample of the population. Some researchers have expressed reservations about the relevance of type to job satisfaction, as well as concerns about the potential misuse of the instrument in labeling people.

The Myers-Briggs Company, then known as Consulting Psychologists Press (and later CPP), became the exclusive publisher of the MBTI in 1975. They call it "the world's most widely used personality assessment", with as many as two million assessments administered annually. The Myers-Briggs Company and other proponents state that the indicator meets or exceeds the reliability of other psychological instruments.

Although some studies claim support for validity and reliability, other studies suggest that the MBTI "lacks convincing validity data" and that it is pseudoscience.

The MBTI has poor predictive validity of employees' job performance ratings. As noted above under Precepts and ethics, the MBTI measures preferences, not ability. The use of the MBTI as a predictor of job success is expressly discouraged in the Manual. It is argued that the MBTI only continues to be popular because many people are qualified to administer it, it is not difficult to understand, and there are many supporting books, websites and other sources which are readily available to the general public.

Correlations with other instruments

Keirsey temperaments
David Keirsey developed the Keirsey Temperament Sorter after learning about the MBTI system, though he traces four "temperaments" back to Ancient Greek traditions.  He maps these temperaments to the Myers–Briggs groupings SP, SJ, NF, and NT. He also gives each of the 16 MBTI types a name, as shown in the below table.

Big Five
McCrae and Costa based their Five Factor Model (FFM) on Goldberg's Big Five theory. McCrae and Costa present correlations between the MBTI scales and the Big Five personality constructs measured, for example, by the NEO-PI-R. The five purported personality constructs have been labeled: extraversion, openness, agreeableness, conscientiousness, and neuroticism (emotional instability), although there is not universal agreement on the Big Five theory and the related Five-Factor Model (FFM). The following correlations are based on the results from 267 men and 201 women as part of a longitudinal study of aging.

These correlations refer to the second letter shown, i.e., the table shows that I and P have negative correlations with extraversion and conscientiousness, respectively, while F and N have positive correlations with agreeableness and openness, respectively. These results suggest that the four MBTI scales can be incorporated within the Big Five personality trait constructs, but that the MBTI lacks a measure for emotional stability dimension of the Big Five (though the TDI, discussed above, has addressed that dimension). Emotional stability (or neuroticism) is a predictor of depression and anxiety disorders.

These findings led McCrae and Costa to conclude that, "correlational analyses showed that the four MBTI indices did measure aspects of four of the five major dimensions of normal personality. The five-factor model provides an alternative basis for interpreting MBTI findings within a broader, more commonly shared conceptual framework." However, "there was no support for the view that the MBTI measures truly dichotomous preferences or qualitatively distinct types, instead, the instrument measures four relatively independent dimensions."

In popular culture 
At the time of the COVID-19 pandemic, MBTI testing became highly popular among young South Koreans who were using it in an attempt to find compatible dating partners. The craze led to a rise in MBTI-themed products including beers, music playlists and computer games. One survey reported that by December 2021, nearly half of the population had taken the MBTI personality test. Also, the MBTI personality test became an issue in the presidential election.

See also

Criticism
 Labeling theory
 Cold reading
Others
 Adjective Check List (ACL)
 Brain types
 DISC assessment
 Riso–Hudson Enneagram Type Indicator
 FIRO-B
 Forte Communication Style Profile
 Holland Codes
 Humorism
 
 Interpersonal compatibility
 Jungian Type Index
 
 
 Personality Assessment System
 Personality clash
 Personality psychology
 Revised NEO Personality Inventory
 
 Socionics, a sister theory
 Strong Interest Inventory
 Minnesota Multiphasic Personality Inventory
 Thomas Kilmann Conflict Mode Instrument
 
  (CPI 260)

Notes

References

Citations

Bibliography 
 
 
 
 
 
 
 
 Falt, Jack. Bibliography of MBTI/Temperament Books by Author . Retrieved December 20, 2004
 
 Georgia State University. GSU Master Teacher Program: On Learning Styles . Retrieved December 20, 2004.
 
 
 
 
 Jung, Carl Gustav (1965). Memories, Dreams, Reflections. Vintage Books: New York, 1965. p. 207 
 Jung, C. G. (1971). Psychological types (Collected works of C. G. Jung, volume 6). (3rd ed.). Princeton, NJ: Princeton University Press. First appeared in German in 1921. 

 Krauskopf, Charles J. and Saunders, David R. (1994) Personality and Ability: The Personality Assessment System. Maryland: University Press of America. 
 
 
 

 
 
 Pearman, R.; and Albritton, S. (1996). I'm Not Crazy, I'm Just Not You: The Real Meaning of the Sixteen Personality Types. Mountain View, CA: Davies-Black Publishing. 
 Pearman, R.; Lombardo, M.; and Eichinger, R. (2005). YOU: Being More Effective In Your MBTI Type. Minn.:Lominger International, Inc.

External links 

 
 

Analytical psychology
Personality typologies
Personality tests
Carl Jung
Pseudoscience